Yale was a federal electoral district in British Columbia, Canada, that was represented in the House of Commons of Canada from 1872 to 1892 and from 1917 to 1953.

It first appeared when the original Yale District riding, which was created and filled by special byelection in 1871 at the time of BC's entry into the Canadian Confederation, was abolished and replaced by "Yale" riding.  Yale riding spanned both Yale and Kootenay Land Districts, that is to say, the entirety of the southern province from the Fraser Canyon to the Rockies. It was last used in the 1891 election, and was merged in 1892 with the Cariboo riding to form Yale—Cariboo.

That arrangement lasted until 1914 when a further redistribution separated Yale and Cariboo once again. This second incarnation was considerably smaller than the first because Kootenay district was now in a different riding.   In 1903, the riding of Kootenay was split off from what had been the original Yale riding.

The "new" Yale riding excluded the Town of Yale, and when it was reconstituted, coincided with the provincial Okanagan riding except for the city of Salmon Arm.

The new incarnation of Yale lasted until 1952, when the Yale name vanished from the Commons and the Okanagan ridings, Okanagan Boundary and Okanagan—Revelstoke were created.  The old core area around the town of historic and once-important Yale, which has long since became depopulated by being bypassed by massive growth elsewhere, was attached to the Fraser Valley riding, then to its successor Fraser Valley East, and then to today's Chilliwack—Fraser Canyon.  It was not in the second incarnation of the Yale riding when it was reconstituted in 1914.

Demographics

History and political geography 

This riding was created as Yale District  in 1871 as a result of British Columbia joining Confederation. In 1872, it was abolished and replaced by "Yale" for the 1872 federal election.  This original version of the riding covered both Yale and Kootenay Land Districts, in other words the whole of the southern portion of the province from the Fraser Canyon to the Rocky Mountains. It existed in this form until 1892, when Yale was amalgamated with Cariboo to form Yale—Cariboo, also known as "Yale and Cariboo" when recognized by the Speaker. The first election had only 62 voters, the second 109, and most of these were in the area of the Fraser Canyon towns of Boston Bar, Hope, Yale. The rest were a scattered handful of ranches and mining camps in the Okanagan, Nicola and Similkameen regions.

Under the Representation Act of 1892, the constituencies of Yale and Cariboo were united to form Yale—Cariboo. In 1914, that riding was broken up and the Yale and Cariboo riding-names were restored, although the new constituencies were considerably smaller than before. The restored Yale riding included the Boundary Country around Grand Forks and Greenwood, but the Kootenay was now a separate riding and the town of Yale itself was not in the restored Yale riding, but in the new riding of Westminster District. The first election using the new boundaries was in 1917, although the seat was won by acclamation by the Hon. Martin Burrell, who had been the member for Yale—Cariboo.

It was reconstituted as Yale in 1914 and lasted until 1952. This version of the riding comprised the provincial electoral district of Okanagan, excepting the parts of the city and district municipality of Salmon Arm contained in the provincial riding, and the provincial electoral districts of Similkameen, Greenwood and Grand Forks.  Yale therefore contained the entire Okanagan, Boundary and Similkameen country, and the Fraser Canyon immediately around the town of Yale itself.  The main difference from the earlier version of the riding is the absence of the Kootenays.

A redistribution in 1933 rearranged the riding's boundaries, once again including the original core area around Yale and Hope, though the bulk of the riding's population remained in the orchard towns of the Okanagan.

The district was recreated in 1914 for use in the Canadian federal election of 1917.  It was again abolished in 1952, being redistricted into Okanagan Boundary and Okanagan—Revelstoke.

Yale riding was abolished in 1952. Its successor ridings were Okanagan Boundary and Okanagan—Revelstoke. Areas of the original core area around Yale are now part of Chilliwack—Fraser Canyon, which extends up the Fraser River to Lillooet.

Members of Parliament

Election results

Yale, 1917–1953

Yale, 1872–1892

See also 

 List of Canadian federal electoral districts
 Past Canadian electoral districts

External links

Riding history from the Library of Parliament
(1872 - 1892)
(1914 - 1952)

Former federal electoral districts of British Columbia